The Best of The Smithereens is a compilation album by Carteret, New Jersey-based rock band The Smithereens, released in 1997.

Track listing

Personnel 
The Smithereens
Pat DiNizio – vocals, guitar
Jim Babjak – guitar
Dennis Diken – drums
Mike Mesaros – bass

References 

The Smithereens albums
1997 compilation albums